The New South Wales Women's Rugby League is the governing body of female rugby league in New South Wales.  It is a member of the Australian Women's Rugby League and New South Wales Rugby League. The organisation is responsible for administering the New South Wales Women's rugby league team, Women's City vs Country Origin, Sydney Metropolitan Women's Rugby League and Country Rugby League Women's RL competitions.

Sydney Metropolitan Women's Rugby League Clubs

Illawarra Women's Rugby League Clubs
Berkeley
Corrimal
Helensburgh Tiger Lillies
Windang Juniors

North West NSW Women's Rugby League Clubs
Armidale Rams
Bendemeer
Gunnedah Panthers
Enverell Sapphires
Moree Boomerangs
Tamworth

Penrith Girls Competitions Rugby League Clubs
Games played in 9-a-side format with 20 minute halves

Two age groups:
1) U13 - 15
2) U16 - 18

Doonside
Glenmore Park
Lower Mountains
Minchinbury
PCYC
Quakers Hill
St Clair
Western City Tigers

Parramatta Girls Competitions Rugby League Clubs
Games played in 9-a-side format
Age groups:
1) U13 - 15

Canley Heights
Canley Vale
Hills District
Merrylands

ACT Female Competitions Rugby League Clubs
U13 - U17 Girls & Open Women's Competitions

Goulburn
Gungahlin Bulls
Tuggeranong Buffaloes
Valley Dragons
Yass
Westies
Queanbeyan Blues
Queanbeyan Roos

See also

Rugby league in New South Wales
Queensland Women's Rugby League
Western Australian Women's Rugby League

References

External links 

Women's rugby league governing bodies in Australia
Women